Alain Génestier (born c. 1948) is a former professional rally driver from France. He was the winner of the first Dakar Rally in the cars class (fourth overall) in 1979.

Dakar Rally

References

External links
Driver profile at Dakar D'Antan

Dakar Rally drivers
Dakar Rally winning drivers
French rally drivers
Off-road racing drivers
1930s births
Living people